Lee Ming-che (born 1975) is a Taiwanese pro-democracy activist, detained by Chinese authorities in late March 2017. After Lee entered the domain of China from Macao, he lost the ability to directly contact his family. There have been calls for his immediate release by human rights activists around the world. These include Hong Kong activist Joshua Wong, who joined Taiwan's New Power Party Executive Chairman Huang Kuo-chang, and former Sunflower Movement leaders to condemn Lee’s continued detention.

Lee is a former worker for the Democratic Progressive Party and NGO employee, and the incident led to friction between security institutions in Taiwan and mainland China.

A representative of the mainland Chinese government has stated that Lee was under investigation on suspicion of harming national security. Ma Xiaoguang, a spokesman for Beijing's Taiwan Affairs Office (TAO), has said in a press conference that Lee is "currently in good physical condition".

Lee’s wife, Lee Ching-yu, called on Beijing to immediately release him, and to clarify the charges brought against him and ensure his rights. Lee has previously used social media to promote the success of Taiwan's democracy to 'at least 100 people' in communist China. On this occasion, he had gone to mainland China to arrange for his mother-in-law's medical treatment. In an effort to find her husband, Lee Ching-yu booked a flight from Taiwan to mainland China on 10 April, however she was banned from entering mainland China by its Ministry of Public Security.

On 13 April, an editorial in Taiwan News asserted that this is the type of situation that should be covered by the “Cross-Strait Joint Crime-Fighting and Judicial Mutual Assistance Agreement”.

In September 2017, Lee Ming-che pleaded guilty to "subverting state power" in a court in Hunan. His wife and supporters say his confession was forced. Since his conviction he has been incarcerated in Chishan Prison. In November 2017, Lee was sentenced to five years imprisonment.

In 2020 the Rescue Lee Ming-che Team held an exhibition in Taipei which featured 365 letters written to Lee Ming-che, the Team also organized a two week long lecture series on Lee’s case and the general human rights situation in mainland China. The letter writing campaign was a response to Lee being denied the right to write/receive letters and telephone calls which violates both the Prison Law of the People’s Republic of China and the UN Standard Minimum Rules for the Treatment of Prisoners.

In April 2022, the Taiwan Affairs Office disclosed that Lee's health condition was stable, and that he would be released soon, completing a five-year term in detention. Lee was formally released on 14 April 2022, and returned to Taiwan the next day.

References 

Taiwanese activists
People from Taipei
Living people
1975 births
Taiwanese prisoners and detainees
Prisoners and detainees of the People's Republic of China